George Barton (born 27 September 1997) is a Canadian rugby union player who plays centre for Rugby ATL in Major League Rugby (MLR) and for the Canadian national team. 

Barton previously played for the Clermont Espoirs in France, following his performances for the Canada U20s where he was also captain.

Club statistics

References

1997 births
Living people
Canadian expatriate rugby union players
Canadian expatriate sportspeople in the United States
Expatriate rugby union players in the United States
People from Duncan, British Columbia
Seattle Seawolves players
Canadian rugby union players
Canada international rugby union players
Rugby union centres
Rugby ATL players